Still Me is a 1999 autobiography written by actor Christopher Reeve. The book tells of Reeve's experiences of making the Superman films and about his horseback riding accident which resulted in his quadriplegia and its effects on his life. The book spent eleven weeks on the New York Times Best Seller list in 1999. Reeve won a Grammy Award for Best Spoken Word Album.

References

Neurotrauma
Grammy Award for Best Spoken Word Album